The 2014 Tour of Oman was the fifth edition of the Tour of Oman cycling stage race. It was rated as a 2.HC event on the UCI Asia Tour, and was held from 18 to 23 February 2014, in Oman.

For the second year in a row, the race was won by  rider Chris Froome – becoming its first repeat winner – after he won the queen stage of the race, to Jabal al Akhdar, on the penultimate day and held the race leader's red jersey to the finish, the next day, at the Matrah Corniche.

The combative classification – to which points from mountains and sprints were awarded towards – was won by Preben Van Hecke of the  team, while  won the teams classification, after also placing Sergio Henao inside the top ten overall, as well as Froome.

Teams
Eighteen teams competed in the 2014 Tour of Oman. These included thirteen UCI World Tour teams and five UCI Professional Continental teams.

The teams that participated in the race were:

Stages

Stage 1
18 February 2014 — As Suwayq Castle to Naseem Garden,

Stage 2
19 February 2014 — Al Bustan to Quriyat,

Stage 3
20 February 2014 — BankMuscat to Al Bustan,

Stage 4
21 February 2014 — Wadi Al Abiyad to Ministry of Housing,

Stage 5
22 February 2014 — Bidbid to Jabal al Akhdar,

Stage 6
23 February 2014 — As Sifah to Matrah Corniche,

Classification leadership table

References

External links

Tour of Oman
Tour of Oman
Tour of Oman
Tour of Oman